The 1951–52 Rugby Union County Championship was the 52nd edition of England's premier rugby union club competition at the time.

Middlesex won the competition for the second time after defeating Lancashire in the final.

Final

See also
 English rugby union system
 Rugby union in England

References

Rugby Union County Championship
County Championship (rugby union) seasons